The Gesta Regum Anglorum (Latin for "Deeds of the Kings of the English"), originally titled  ("On the Deeds of the Kings of the English") and also anglicized as  or , is an early-12th-century history of the kings of England by William of Malmesbury. It is a companion work of his Gesta Pontificum Anglorum (Deeds of the English Bishops) and was followed by his Historia Novella, which continued its account for several more years.  The portions of the work concerning the First Crusade were derived from Gesta Francorum Iherusalem peregrinantium, a chronicle by Fulcher of Chartres.

Editions
 .
 . 
 .
 .  & 
 .  &

References

12th century in England
12th-century Latin books
English chronicles
Latin historical texts from Norman and Angevin England